The 18th annual Webby Awards for 2014 was held at Cipriani Wall Street in New York City on May 19, 2014, which was hosted by comedian and actor Patton Oswalt. The awards ceremony was streamed live at the Webby Awards website.

Lifetime Achievement was awarded to Lawrence Lessig for his work with intellectual property be co-founding Creative Commons and the person of the year was the artist Banksy.

Nominees and winners

(from http://winners.webbyawards.com/2014)

ReferencesWinners and nominees are generally named according to the organization or website winning the award, although the recipient is, technically, the web design firm or internal department that created the winning site and in the case of corporate websites, the designer's client.  Web links are provided for informational purposes, both in the most recently available archive.org version before the awards ceremony and, where available, the current website.  Many older websites no longer exist, are redirected, or have been substantially redesigned.''

External links
Official site

2014
2014 awards in the United States
2014 in New York City
May 2014 events in the United States
2014 in Internet culture